Coșula is a commune in Botoșani County, Western Moldavia, Romania. It is composed of four villages: Buda, Coșula, Pădureni and Șupitca. It was established in 2003, when it was detached from Copălău.

References

Communes in Botoșani County
Localities in Western Moldavia